is a 1931 Japanese silent comedy drama film directed by Mikio Naruse, and the first surviving film by the director. Naruse biographer Catherine Russell called it a combination "of nansensu comedy, tendency film, and shoshimin-eiga with a particularly flamboyant method of decoupage".

Plot
Insurance salesman Okabe is scolded by his wife for their shortage of money and always being behind with their rental payments. He promises that the situation will better soon, as he is about to sell an insurance policy to Mrs. Toda, a wealthy neighbour. At Mrs. Toda's house, he gets into an argument with Nakamura, a competing salesman. As a result, Mrs. Toda throws both of them out. Meanwhile, Okabe's son Susumu gets into a fight with the neighbour's kids, including Mrs. Toda's son, for not letting him play with their toy airplane. Okabe, afraid that Mrs. Toda might sue him, scolds Susumu and comforts her son, taking him home. Mrs. Toda, who has heard that a child was hit by a train, is relieved by the sight of Okabe and her son and agrees to buy an insurance from him. Okabe decides to surprise Susumu and buys a toy airplane for him. Back home he learns that it was his own son who was hit by the train, and runs to the hospital. Susumu is in a critical condition, but finally recovers.

Cast
Isamu Yamaguchi as Okabe
Tomoko Naniwa as Okabe's wife
Seiichi Kato as Susumu, Okabe's son
Shizue Akiyama as Mrs. Toda
Tokio Seki as Nakamura
Hideo Sugawara

Release
Flunky, Work Hard! premiered in Japan on August 8, 1931. It was shown in the U.S. as part of a 25 films Naruse retrospective in 1985, organised by the Kawakita Memorial Film Institute and film scholar Audie Bock.

Notes

References

External links

1931 films
1931 drama films
1931 comedy films
1931 short films
Japanese black-and-white films
1931 comedy-drama films
Japanese comedy-drama films
1930s Japanese-language films
Japanese silent short films
Films directed by Mikio Naruse
Shochiku films
Silent comedy-drama films